Khaldan may refer to:
Khalden training camp, Afghanistan
Xaldan, Azerbaijan
Khaldan, Iran